2 Corinthians 4 is the fourth chapter of the Second Epistle to the Corinthians in the New Testament of the Christian Bible. It is authored by Paul the Apostle and Timothy (2 Corinthians 1:1) in Macedonia in 55–56 CE. Twice in this chapter (verses 1 and 16) this sentence occurs: "Therefore, we do not lose heart".

Text
The original text was written in Koine Greek. This chapter is divided into 18 verses.

Textual witnesses
Some early manuscripts containing the text of this chapter are:
Papyrus 46 (~AD 200)
Codex Vaticanus (325–350)
Codex Sinaiticus (330–360)
Codex Alexandrinus (400–440; extant verses 1–12)
Codex Ephraemi Rescriptus (~450)
Codex Freerianus (~450; extant verses 6–7,16–17)
Codex Claromontanus (~550)

Old Testament references
: Psalm

We do not lose heart
The Greek οὐκ ἐγκακοῦμεν (ouk enkakoumen) is a Pauline phrase used twice in this chapter, derived from the verb ἐκκακέω (ekkakeó), meaning "to faint". Jesus spoke a parable concerning the constant necessity of prayer and [teaching] that the Christians should not grow weary of prayer".

Verse 2
But have renounced the hidden things of dishonesty, not walking in craftiness, nor handling the word of God deceitfully; but by manifestation of the truth commending ourselves to every man's conscience in the sight of God.

Verse 7

 But we have this treasure in earthen vessels, that the excellence of the power may be of God and not of us.

"Treasure in earthen vessels": The Gospel, as a "treasure" because "it contains rich truths", is placed in "earthen vessels," i.e. "ministers of the word." It alludes either to the "earth", where hidden treasures are to be dug, or to "pots and vessels made of earth", or to "earthen pitchers", formerly to carry lights or lamps (cf. : three hundred men of Gideon took empty pitchers and placed lamps within the pitchers); the latter may represent the Gospel as a "glorious light, shining in darkness". The Greek word ostrakinoiu signifies "shells of fishes" which Philo the Jew compare the human body. This reference may point to pearls, which are found in shells, particularly in oysters, expressing the "frail mortal bodies of the ministers of the Gospel" (comparable to the brittle shells) as they work under persecutions, for Gospel's sake (cf. ).

See also
Jesus Christ
Related Bible parts: Psalm 116, Romans 8, 2 Corinthians 1, 2 Corinthians 7, 2 Corinthians 12

References

Sources

External links
 King James Bible - Wikisource
English Translation with Parallel Latin Vulgate
Online Bible at GospelHall.org (ESV, KJV, Darby, American Standard Version, Bible in Basic English)
Multiple bible versions at Bible Gateway (NKJV, NIV, NRSV etc.)

2 Corinthians 4